Scythris skulei is a moth of the family Scythrididae. It was described by Bengt Å. Bengtsson in 1997. It is found in Greece.

Etymology
This species is dedicated to the first collector of this species, the Danish lepidopterist Bjarne Skule.

References

skulei
Moths described in 1997